Buck Creek is a stream in Lincoln County in the U.S. state of Missouri. It is a tributary of the North Fork of the Cuivre River.

Buck Creek may be named for the bucks (male deer) observed along its course.

See also
List of rivers of Missouri

References

Rivers of Lincoln County, Missouri
Rivers of Missouri